Guardians of the Wild is a 1928 American silent Western film directed by Henry MacRae and written by Basil Dickey, George Morgan and Gardner Bradford. The film stars Rex the Wonder Horse, Jack Perrin, Starlight the Horse, Ethlyne Clair, Al Ferguson and Robert Homans. The film was released on September 16, 1928, by Universal Pictures.

Cast      
 Rex the Wonder Horse as Rex
 Jack Perrin as Jerry Lane
 Starlight the Horse as Starlight
 Ethlyne Clair as Madge Warren
 Al Ferguson as Mark Haman
 Robert Homans as John Warren
 Bernard Siegel as Won Long Hop

References

External links
 

1928 films
1928 Western (genre) films
American black-and-white films
Films directed by Henry MacRae
Silent American Western (genre) films
Universal Pictures films
1920s English-language films
1920s American films